Evrim Akyigit (born January 31, 1977 in Izmir, Turkey) is a Dutch actress of Turkish origin. She is best known for her role as Cabar-Elif Özal in the Dutch soap opera Onderweg Naar Morgen.

Filmography

Television

References

External links
 

1977 births
Living people
Dutch people of Turkish descent
Dutch television actresses
Turkish emigrants to the Netherlands
Actresses from İzmir
Dutch film actresses
Dutch soap opera actresses
20th-century Dutch actresses
21st-century Dutch actresses